Scopula impersonata is a moth of the family Geometridae. It is found in China, the Russian Far East, Taiwan and Japan.

The wingspan is 15–20 mm.

Subspecies
Scopula impersonata impersonata (China)
Scopula impersonata accurataria (Christoph, 1881) (Siberia, Amur, Primorye)
Scopula impersonata macescens (Butler, 1879) (Japan)

References

Moths described in 1861
impersonata
Moths of Asia